Sultan Muzaffar Shah I ibni Almarhum Sultan Mahmud Shah (1505-1549) was the first Sultan of Perak from 1528 to 1549. He was the son of Sultan Mahmud Shah of Malacca and Putri Onang Kening, daughter of Sultan Mansur Shah of Kelantan.

Life

Early Years 

Sultan Mahmud Shah had married a princess from the Kelantan Sultanate named Putri Onang Kening. The couple later had a son named Raja Muzaffar who was born in 1505.

When the Malacca Sultanate fell to the Portuguese Empire in 1511, Raja Muzaffar's father, Sultan Mahmud Shah together with his wife, children, and his entourage retreated to Ulu Muar. Then to Pahang and then to Pulau Bintan, Riau and ruled there.  While in Pulau Bintan, Raja Muzaffar was married to Tun Terang. Tun Terang was the stepdaughter of Sultan Mahmud Shah and the daughter of Tun Fatimah and her first husband Tun Ali. Raja Muzaffar and his wife had a son named Raja Mansur, the future Sultan of Perak.

Bintan was defeated by the Portuguese in 1526. Sultan Mahmud Shah later retreated to Kampar in Sumatra. When he died in Kampar around 1528, Raja Ali succeeded him. Raja Muzaffar was driven out by the Bendahara and the chiefs, so he with his wife and son named Raja Mansur left Kampar and then stopped in Klang and went to Perak.

Reign 

Raja Muzaffar was appointed by the people of Perak as the first Sultan of Perak. That is the story of the first Sultan of Perak as mentioned in the Malay Annals. However, the story is different according to Sejarah Raja Perak.

At the time of Sultan Mahmud Shah's residence in Kampar, Perak was not a sultanate. People in Perak then sent their representatives, namely Tun Saban and Nakhoda Kasim to Kampar to face Raja Muzaffar's father. The purpose of the representatives from Perak facing Sultan Mahmud Shah was to seek the consent of him giving the permission for Raja Muzaffar to become Sultan of Perak, because the state of Perak was under the rule of the Malacca Sultanate since Sultan Mahmud Shah ruled it again. Sultan Mahmud Shah later accepted the request of the representatives from Perak and his prince, Raja Muzaffar, was ordered to go to Perak to become sultan. From Kampar, Raja Muzaffar then went to Klang to visit his family. From Klang with the guidance of Nakhoda Tumi who came from Manjong, Raja Muzaffar continued his journey to Perak. The arrival of Raja Muzaffar to Perak was welcomed at Beting Beras Basah and he was taken home via the Perak river to enter Perak.

Raja Muzaffar was later installed as the first Sultan of Perak with the title of Sultan Muzaffar Shah in Tanah Abang which is located in the Lambor Kanan area.

In the Malay Annals it is stated that Sultan Muzaffar Shah had invited Tun Mahmud, son of Tun Isap Berakah, from Selangor to come to Perak. Tun Mahmud was later made the first Bendahara in Perak. Soon afterwards, Tun Mahmud was summoned by Sultan Alauddin Riayat Shah II who ruled Johor at the request of the Bendahara of Johor and his father, Tun Isap Berakah.

Tun Saban 

According to Sejarah Raja Perak, not long after Sultan Muzaffar Shah ascended the throne in Perak, conflict began to arise between him and Tun Saban. This is because, Tun Saban did not want to give his daughter who was named Tun Merah to be the wife of Sultan Muzaffar Shah. The Sultan of Perak then ordered his servants to take Tun Merah down to the palace until the outbreak of war.

A war broke out between the followers of the Sultan of Perak and the followers of Tun Saban. Sultan Muzaffar Shah then offered the title of Bendahara of the Perak state government to anyone who could kill Tun Saban. A son of a Raja of Pagaruyung (Minangkabau) by a concubine who went to Perak together with Sultan Muzaffar Shah from Kampar, namely Megat Terawis, accepted the Sultan's offer. During the war, Megat Terawis finally succeeded in killing Tun Saban and then Sultan Muzaffar Shah appointed Megat Terawis as Bendahara of Perak by replacing Tun Mahmud who had gone to Johor.

Since then, the position of Bendahara of Perak has been held by the descendants of Megat Terawis until it ended during the reign of Sultan Iskandar Zulkarnain (15th Sultan of Perak).

After Tun Saban died, the entire state of Perak was then handed over to the rule of Sultan Muzaffar Shah whose center of government was in Tanah Abang.

Death 

Sultan Muzaffar Shah I ruled Perak in 1528 until 1549 when he died after 21 years of ruling. He was buried in Tanah Abang.

References

Source(s) 

https://www.orangperak.com/sultan-muzaffar-shah-i-sultan-perak-pertama.html

Sultans of Perak
1505 births
1549 deaths